Robert Marett may refer to:

 Robert Pipon Marett (1820–1884), British  lawyer, journalist, poet, and politician
 Robert Ranulph Marett (1866–1943), British ethnologist
 Robert Marett (diplomat) (1907–1981), British author and diplomat